Acanthaspis obscura is a species of assassin bug from tropical and subtropical Africa.

Description

Adults 
It has a dull black body with two white spots on each wing, with a third dull honey-coloured spot at the tip of each wing. Some individuals have shorter wings.

Distribution and habitat 
Acanthaspis obscura in occurs in tropical and subtropical Africa, including in Ethiopia, Kenya and South Africa. Adults are found living under bark and stones, and in termite mounds.

Ecology

Nymphs 
The nymphs cover themselves in the exoskeletons of their prey and other debris. They may be found in deserted termite mounds along with adults, where they eat ants.

Adults 
Like other species in this family, Acanthaspis obscura is a predatory species. They may feed on insects much larger than them and have a venomous fluid which paralyses and kills their prey within seconds of being bitten. They are more active at night than during the day and are attracted to light. Shorter winged individuals are found living with the full winged individuals.

Relationship with humans 
This species may enter human homes, especially in rural areas, as they are attrcated to the light. It is known to bite people and is sometimes called the nagby (Afrikaans for night bee) by locals. A study in 1997 recorded at least 13 instances of humans being bitten by Acanthaspis obscura. These bites are visible as a black spot surrounded by a white ring and swelling, often with a nearby cyst filled with a dark thick fluid.

The bite is painful due to the injected fluid, which is ordinarily used to hunt prey, and causes side effects in people. These effects may last for months after the bite occurred. It causes a numb, burning sensation which lasts for several hours and causes the glands in the arms and legs to swell up for up to three days. It may also cause rapid breathing, heart palpitations and rapid breathing as well as welts all over the body.

References 

Insects described in 1855
Insects of Africa
Insects of Ethiopia
Insects of Kenya
Insects of South Africa
Reduviidae